Khalid Kidwai is Bollywood film producer. He has been producer of Rambhajjan Zindabaad which stars legend actor Om Puri as in lead.

References

Indian television producers
Living people
Film producers from Mumbai
1974 births